The mid front unrounded vowel is a type of vowel sound that is used in some spoken languages. There is no dedicated symbol in the International Phonetic Alphabet that represents the exact mid front unrounded vowel between close-mid  and open-mid , but it is normally written . In Sinology and Koreanology,  is sometimes used, for example in the Zhengzhang Shangfang reconstructions.

For many of the languages that have only one phonemic front unrounded vowel in the mid-vowel area (neither close nor open), the vowel is pronounced as a true mid vowel and is phonetically distinct from either a close-mid or open-mid vowel. Examples are Basque, Spanish, Romanian, Japanese, Turkish, Finnish, Greek, Hejazi Arabic, Serbo-Croatian and Korean (Seoul dialect). A number of dialects of English also have such a mid front vowel. However, there is no general predisposition. Igbo and Egyptian Arabic, for example, have a close-mid , and Bulgarian has an open-mid , but none of these languages have another phonemic mid front vowel.

Kensiu, spoken in Malaysia and Thailand, is claimed to be unique in having true-mid vowels that are phonemically distinct from both close-mid and open-mid vowels, without differences in other parameters such as backness or roundedness.

Features

Occurrence

Notes

References

External links
 
 

Mid vowels
Front vowels
Unrounded vowels